Robert Stillington (about 1405 – May 1491) was an English cleric and administrator who was Bishop of Bath and Wells from 1465 and twice served as Lord Chancellor under King Edward IV. In 1483 he was instrumental in the accession of King Richard III, leading to later reprisals against him under King Henry VII.

Life
Stillington was Archdeacon of Taunton (1450–1465) and Archdeacon of Berkshire (1464–1465) when he was made Keeper of the Privy Seal from 1460 to 1467.

Stillington was selected as Bishop of Bath and Wells on 30 October 1465, and was consecrated on 16 March 1466. He was appointed Lord Chancellor on 20 June 1467 and held the office until 29 September 1470, when Henry VI was restored to the throne. After the return of Edward IV, he was reappointed to his former office and held it until 18 June 1473, when Edward dismissed him.

In 1478, Stillington spent some weeks in prison, apparently as a result of some association with the disgraced George, Duke of Clarence. It has been suggested  that he gave Clarence information about the king's prior association with another woman, information that would have put Clarence in a position to claim the throne for himself .

After Edward's death in April 1483, Stillington was a member of the council of the boy-king Edward V. Some time in June, a clergyman, identified as Stillington only by the writings [Mémoires, book VI chapter 17] of the French diplomat Philippe de Commines (who referred to him as levesque de Bas (bishop of the low) and ce mauvais evesque (this bad bishop), told Richard, Duke of Gloucester, the Lord Protector, that the marriage of Edward IV and Elizabeth Woodville had been invalid on the grounds of Edward's earlier marriage to Lady Eleanor Talbot, at which he claimed to have officiated. This led to Elizabeth Woodville's children by Edward IV being declared illegitimate and the Duke of Gloucester ascending the throne as Richard III.

After Henry VII defeated Richard III at Bosworth in 1485, he immediately had Stillington imprisoned again. Henry had the bigamy charge against Edward IV reversed, and married Edward's daughter, Elizabeth of York.

Some years after Stillington's second release, he became involved in the plot to place the impostor Lambert Simnel on the throne in 1487. After finding refuge at Oxford University, he was eventually handed over to the king and imprisoned. He was buried in a chapel of his own founding, since demolished, at Wells Cathedral.

Citations

References
 
 

15th-century English Roman Catholic bishops
Bishops of Bath and Wells
Archdeacons of Taunton
Archdeacons of Berkshire
Lord chancellors of England
Lords Privy Seal
1420 births
1491 deaths